Iron River is a hamlet in central Alberta, Canada within the Municipal District of Bonnyville No. 87.

See also 
List of hamlets in Alberta

References 

Hamlets in Alberta
Municipal District of Bonnyville No. 87